The Wales women's national rugby union team first played in 1987. Wales plays in the Women's Rugby World Cup and the Women's Six Nations Championship

History
Wales Women have played as a team officially since 5 April 1987 when a Wales Women team, led by Liza Burgess, took on an England Women side at Pontypool Park. Prior to 1987, Welsh players were selected to represent Great Britain with the first representative side featuring players from Wales running against France at Richmond Athletic Ground in 1986. Great Britain played as a team on several occasions until 1990, beating Italy in their final match. Wales have played England every year since 1987.

Wales hosted the first Women's Rugby World Cup in Cardiff in 1991 and since then they have participated in a further four of the five tournaments finishing fourth in 1994, their highest ever finish. The IRB adopted the competition in 1998, which was won by the New Zealand Black Ferns who also won the tournaments in Barcelona in 2002 Edmonton, Canada in 2006.

The Welsh Women's Rugby Union was created in 1994 charged with promoting and governing the development and practice of Women's Rugby in Wales; the other three home unions also took charge of their own administration effectively ending the function of the WRFU in the process. The WWRU also became affiliated to the Welsh Rugby Union at the same time.

The creation of four separate home unions for Women's Rugby in Great Britain also saw the introduction of the Women's Home Nations competition with the first set of internationals taking place in 1995. Wales Women's early years in the tournament saw victories only against Ireland Women . Wales Women also remain the only touring team from Wales to have won a Test series in South Africa, beating the Bokkies by two Test to nil back in 1994.

From 2004 to 2006 a policy of selecting only players based in Wales resulted in a series of poor results – and failure to qualify for the 2006 World Cup. When the policy was reversed the team immediately recorded their best Six Nations performance, with a victory over France in 2006, wins over Scotland in 2006 & 2007, ending a ten-year drought of wins against their Celtic opponents, and culminating with victory over England in 2009 on their way to a Triple Crown. The National 7s squad lifted the European 7s title in 2006, beating England in the final but narrowly failed to secure a place in the 2009 Rugby World Cup 7s. In 2007 Wales also re-entered the FIRA Championship, using the tournament to give tournament experience to its development team.

In November 2021, the Welsh Rugby Union announced that they would be offering 12-month contracts to Wales Women for the first time in its history. The contracts take effect on January 1, 2022.

Players

Current squad 
Wales named their final 32-player squad on the 21 September 2022, for the 2021 Rugby World Cup.

Previous squads

Notable players 

 Liza Burgess - Inducted into the 2018 World Rugby Hall of Fame.
 Rafiuke Taylor - In 2019, became Wales women's first ever dual code rugby international.

Records

World Cup

Overall 

(Full internationals only)Correct as of 13 November 2021

References

External links
The Welsh Rugby Union
Bred In Heaven influential Welsh rugby discussion site
Welsh rugby news from icwales
Welsh rugby union news from Planet Rugby
Welsh Rugby Fans New website dedicated to Welsh rugby fans
Sports Council of Wales Welsh Sports Hall of Fame

Women's national rugby union teams
European national women's rugby union teams
National
W